Yury Aristov (born 13 December 1973) is a Uzbekistani hurdler. He competed in the men's 110 metres hurdles at the 1996 Summer Olympics.

References

External links
 

1973 births
Living people
Athletes (track and field) at the 1996 Summer Olympics
Uzbekistani male hurdlers
Olympic athletes of Uzbekistan
Place of birth missing (living people)